Jurgenne Honculada-Primavera (born 22 February) is a widely cited Filipina marine scientist. For her research in mangrove ecosystem conservation she was honored as one of Time magazine's Heroes of the Environment for 2008. She was inducted into the National Academy of Science and Technology (NAST) in 2015.

Biography
Jurgenne and her twin sister, Georgette, were born on 22 February in Mindanao, in the Philippines.

Primavera completed a BS in zoology from the University of the Philippines Diliman. For nearly a decade she taught biology and zoology at Mindanao State University, until a growing insurgency caused her to take a research position with the Aquaculture Department of the Southeast Asian Fisheries Development Center in the safer Visayas.

She earned her MA in zoology from Indiana University and her PhD in marine biology from the University of the Philippines. In 2005, she received a Pew Fellowship in marine conservation. She was inducted into the National Academy of Science and Technology (NAST) in 2015.

Books

References

People from Agusan del Norte
Marine biologists
University of the Philippines Diliman alumni
Indiana University alumni
Year of birth missing (living people)
Living people